Cainsa is a small town in the Artigas Department of northern Uruguay.

Geography

Population
According to the 2011 census, its population was 355.

References

External links
INE map of Cainsa

Populated places in the Artigas Department